Mitrellatoma angustata is an extinct species of sea snail, a marine gastropod mollusk in the family Mitromorphidae.

Description
(Original description) The shell shows narrow spiral grooves; seven on the penultimate and fifteen on the body whorl.

Distribution
This extinct marine species is endemic to New Zealand.

References

 F.W. Hutton, New Species of Tertiary Shells; The New Zealand Journal of Science 1885b, p. 524 (1886, p. 333)
 Powell, Arthur William Baden. "The New Zealand recent and fossil Mollusca of the family Turridae with general notes on Turrid nomenclature and systematics." (1942).
 Powell, A.W.B. 1979: New Zealand Mollusca: Marine, Land and Freshwater Shells, Collins, Auckland
 Spencer, H.G., Marshall, B.A. & Willan, R.C. (2009). Checklist of New Zealand living Mollusca. pp 196–219. in: Gordon, D.P. (ed.) New Zealand inventory of biodiversity. Volume one. Kingdom Animalia: Radiata, Lophotrochozoa, Deuterostomia. Canterbury University Press, Christchurch
 Beu, A.G. 2011 Marine Molluscs of oxygen isotope stages of the last 2 million years in New Zealand. Part 4. Gastropoda (Ptenoglossa, Neogastropoda, Heterobranchia). Journal of the Royal Society of New Zealand 41, 1–153

External links
 Spencer H.G., Willan R.C., Marshall B.A. & Murray T.J. (2011). Checklist of the Recent Mollusca Recorded from the New Zealand Exclusive Economic Zone
 
 Marshall, B. A. (1995). Molluscan and brachiopod taxa introduced by F.W. Hutton in The New Zealand Journal of Science. Journal of the Royal Society of New Zealand 25: 495–500

angustata
Gastropods described in 1885
Gastropods of New Zealand